The Chozi is a river of Muchinga Province in northeastern Zambia, and tributary of the upper Chambeshi River. One of the tributaries of the Chozi is Nbumba Stream. The village of Chozi is in the vicinity. The watershed between the Chozi and the Saisi River contains Nausu Hill.

The Cleopatra smithi species of freshwater snails are found in the river.

References

Rivers of Zambia 
Muchinga Province